In molecular biology mir-339 microRNA is a short RNA molecule. MicroRNAs function to regulate the expression levels of other genes by several mechanisms. miR-339-5p expression was associated with overall survival in breast cancer.

See also 
 MicroRNA

References

Further reading

External links 
 

MicroRNA
MicroRNA precursor families